The Ulvophyceae or ulvophytes are a class of green algae, distinguished mainly on the basis of ultrastructural morphology, life cycle and molecular phylogenetic data.  The sea lettuce, Ulva, belongs here.  Other well-known members include Caulerpa, Codium, Acetabularia, Cladophora, Trentepohlia and Monostroma.

The Ulvophytes are diverse in their morphology and their habitat. Most are seaweeds such as those listed above. Others, such as Rhizoclonium, Pithophora and some species of Cladophora live in fresh water and in some areas are considered weeds.

Evolution
The origin and early diversification of the Ulvophyceae likely took place in the late Neoproterozoic. Although most contemporary ulvophytes are marine macroalgae (seaweeds), ancestral ulvophytes may have been freshwater, unicellular green algae. Molecular phylogenetic evidence suggests that macroscopic growth was achieved independently in the various major lineages of Ulvophyceae (Ulvales-Ulotrichales, Trentepohliales, Cladophorales, Bryopsidales and Dasycladales).  Fossils are rare but there are some good candidates in a mid-Ordovician lagerstatten.

Current hypothesis on relationships among the main clades of Ulvophyceae are shown below.

See also 
 List of Ulvophyceae genera

References

 
Green algae classes